Shanghai Disneyland Park  is a theme park at the Shanghai Disney Resort in Pudong, Shanghai. Here are the list of attractions below.

Mickey Avenue

Gardens of Imagination

Current attractions
 Dumbo the Flying Elephant
 Fantasia Carousel
 Garden of the Twelve Friends
 Golden Fairytale Fanfare
 Marvel Comic Academy
 Marvel Universe
 Meet Mickey at the Gardens of Imagination

Fantasyland

Current attractions
 Alice in Wonderland Maze
 Frozen: A Sing-Along Celebration
 Hunny Pot Spin
 "Once Upon a Time" Adventure
 Peter Pan's Flight
 Seven Dwarfs Mine Train
 The Many Adventures of Winnie the Pooh
 Voyage to the Crystal Grotto

Treasure Cove

Current attractions
 Explorer Canoes
 Eye of the Storm: Captain Jack’s Stunt Spectacular
 Pirates of the Caribbean: Battle for the Sunken Treasure
 Shipwreck Shore
 Siren's Revenge

Adventure Isle

Current attractions
 Camp Discovery
 Roaring Rapids
 Soaring Over the Horizon

Former attractions
 Tarzan: Call of the Jungle

Tomorrowland

Current attractions
 Baymax Super Exercise Expo
 Buzz Lightyear Planet Rescue
 Club Destin-E at Tomorrowland
 Jet Packs
 Stitch Encounter
 TRON Lightcycle Power Run
 Tomorrowland Pavilion
 Avatar: Explorer Pandora

Former attractions
 Tomorrowland Pavilion
 Star Wars Launch Bay

Toy Story Land

Current attractions
 Slinky Dog Spin
 Rex's Racers
 Woody's Round-Up

City of Zootopia
 Zootopia Ride

Parades

Day parades
 Mickey's Storybook Express

Fireworks
 ILLUMINATE! A Nighttime Celebration

Former entertainment
Ignite the Dream, A Nighttime Spectacular of Magic and Light

References

Shanghai Disneyland

Disneyland